Mangubat (Mang-gubat) (Spanish: Guerrear); is a Filipino surname of Mactan Island origin which means "to wage war" in Cebuano language.

It belongs to a noble lineage according to Vicente de Cadenas y Vicent Chronicler King of Arms of the Kingdom of Spain and the last Cronista Rey de Armas appointed by the Spanish Ministry of Justice.

The Mangubat surname were members of the Spanish nobility class and Filipino native royalty class with a Spanish heraldry (Royal Coat of Arms) of Azure shield, with a gold pike (weapon) or pica, set on stick and positioned vertically at the center of the shield.

As a family name it predated the year 1849 Claveria's Decree, an order requiring Filipino commoners to adopt an already existing Spanish family names made available and listed in the Catalogo Alfabetico de Apellidos. Restricted and exclusively used for the male descendants of Mangubat who was the king of Mactan and successor of Lapu-Lapu in the 16th century to avoid any false claims to special rights and privileges belonging only to the Lords and nobles.

As the kingdom of Mactan joined the Spanish Empire, in late 1560s the mangubat left Mactan Island for the conquest of Luzon, Mindanao, Borneo, and all the other Islands
to unify the archipelago originally composed of several kingdoms and dominions with peoples of different cultures, religions, languages and ethnic backgrounds into one  state known as the Spanish East Indies.

with the (kingdom of Castile) as the mother country, united through Spanish Empire a confederated monarchy composed of many kingdoms and colonies.

The Spanish East Indies (chiefly the Philippine Archipelago) then known as the Philippine Republic as it was transferred to the U.S. and given its independence in 1946.

Before the American came to the Philippines, and before the Republic of the Philippines existed as a Sovereign state in 1946, the Philippine archipelago and the Kingdom of Mactan were part of the territory of the Spanish Empire up to 1899 as Datu Mangubat and other Visayan monarchs joined the Empire.

Filipino Indian monarchs became Filipino Spanish kings, and their warriors were converted into Spanish Imperial Army of the Spanish East Indies Territory, particularly those Indian kingdoms that helped the European Spanish Expeditionary team to gain foothold in the region and voluntarily set out for conquest using their own resources and people, Attacking neighboring kingdoms that refuses to be part of the Union. the term "Filipino" predated the Philippine Republic, and was used since the 1500s to denote Spanish people native to the now Philippine Archipelago.

Mangubat when related to a name, it usually means marauders, pirates and warriors in the Visayas. Antonio de Morga, in his book published in 1609 Sucesos de las Islas Filipinas (Events of the Philippine Islands), mentions that the term means "to go to war and raid for plunder" and described the native as "a race less inclined to agriculture, skillful in navigation and eager for war and raids for pillage and booty". the term was also used by Francisco Baltazar (1778–1862) in his 1838 book Florante at Laura to means "to go for battle". The term is derived from two Filipino words – the verb mang (to do) and the noun gubat (war). "Gubat" is a common word for war in the language of the Visayans,the ancient Tagalog, the Ilocano people, the Igorot people, in Mindanao, and in the Autonomous Region in Muslim Mindanao.

Etymology 

The term is ancient, appearing in both noun and verb forms in the books contemporaneous with the pintados age.

A mangubat was a man who left his homeland, family, and people  for war adventure, mainly for tattooing for honor and fame or sometimes for slave-raiding, with the implication that he planned to return home with his newly won fortune and fame. It does not include the concept of staying in the place one has conquered for in the Pintados culture for one to have a tattoo one must prove himself in battle.

The word existed in both a noun form (mangubat, the person traveling for war adventure)
and a verb form (mangubat, to travel for war or participate in one of these adventures).

Coat of arms 

Mangubat was a Spanish Military Order formed in the 16th century. It belongs to the native conquistadores of Mactan who allied with the Spaniards as Datu Mangubat of the kingdom of Mactan was converted to Christianity  (he was the son and successor of Lapu-Lapu )

The military unit have a coat of arms, or emblems to distinguish them from other military units, and was the most elite and warlike spanish military order of the Spanish East Indies and in the whole Spanish empire at the time as depicted in their Coat of arms. The coat was granted under the strict rules, and requirements of Heraldry rewarded for destroying the muslim kingdoms of Luzon and in Mindanao whose leaders at one time promised to pay tributaries to Spain and until the time it revolted in the 1600 taking advantaged of the revolutions made by Christians in Luzon and in different parts of the Country

Symbolism

The Azure shield Signify Blue Blooded, Royalty and Nobility. Justice, Truth, and Loyalty.

The Pica(Pike) represent Honorable Warrior and Valiant Knight, emblem of gallant Military and Knightly service, The perfection of Martial affairs.
In contrast to the lance that stands for, Strength and Prudence.
The pike symbolizes Military Valor, Strength, and Prudence

The gold Pica(pike) means noble and conquistador or Spanish Hidalgo.

The stick means Jurisdiction and authority.

Brief description of the Mangubat warriors 

"Their weapons consist of large knives curved like cutlasses (Sanggot), spears (Bancao,bangkaw) and caraças (shields). They employ the same kinds of boats as the inhabitants of Luzon. They have the same occupations, products, and means of gain as the inhabitants of all the other islands (i.e. Islands of the Visayas and Mindanao). These Visayans which they call Mangubat are a race less inclined to agriculture, and are skilful in navigation, and eager for war and raids for pillage and booty. Mangubat, this means "to go out for plunder."

Dissemination 
The majority of people with the surname live in the Bantayan Island , Daanbantayan, Cavite, Batangas, Zamboanga del sur and Mactan Island

Mangubat people 

The time when the Philippines was still part of the Spanish Empire, the Spanish government recognized the authority of pre-Spanish kings in the Philippine archipelago who then became known as cabezas(meaning Chief or Head) during hispanization of the region.
From year 1565 up to 1780s the title of Cabeza(chief or leader)  was hereditary, passing to the oldest son from the first Datus (Kings)  who became the first cabezas. The hereditary succession was abolished in favor of the election in year 1780s. The earliest Baptismal book in Mactan Island recorded Lorenzo Mangubat as its Cabeza in year 1719(the record still available in year 1960s until it was reported missing, and the oldest Baptismal record available as of year 2012 only starts in year 1850s).

si Mangubat – (year 1565) was a sovereign of the Kingdom of Mactan. 
Mangubat - (floruit 1590) - from Leyte? - his name was mentioned and referenced by Fr. Antonio Sanchez as one of the "Grandes" (old term for Grandees) - meaning a nobleman of the highest rank in Spanish and Portuguese nobility in his book "Vocabulario de la Lengua Bisaya". written around (1590s-1616) Published year 1711.
Lazaro Mangubat – (Born 1580), was a Gobernador of Cebu; founder of the Lawis Government, and the town of Opon in year 1630, he was also one of the Arm Bearers or Armigers in the Spanish Empire towards the middle of the 17th century.
Alonso Mangubat - (fl. 1636) was a captain of an infantry unit composed of Filipinos that formed part of the Spanish forces to the Mollucas
Francisco Mangubat - (Born 1638)- Batangas son of Borme Mangubat y Catongal
Juan Mangubat y Manigbas - (floruit 1674) - Batangas
Diego Mangubat - (Born 1652)- Batangas
Augustina Mangubat y Mija - (born 1673)- Mexico, Pampanga daughter of Marcos Mangubat
Bernardo Mangubat - (Born 1685) Batangas son of Juan Mangubat
Lucas Mangubat – (fl. 1690), was an Alcalde Mayor/Gobernador of Batangas year 1690
.
Augustin Damacio Mangubat - (Born 1722) Jaro, Iloilo City Son of Juan Mangubat of iloilo  
Lorenzo Mangubat – (fl. 1718) was a cabeza of Opon( Now Lapu–Lapu City)
Alejandro Mangubat – (Born 1828) - was a cabeza of Opon
Don Basilio Mangubat - Juez de Paz (year 1895) of Opon(Cebu) ; town Councilor (1902-1905)
Don Alipio Mangubat – (fl. . 1862) was Gobernador-cillo of Borbon, Cebu
Don Leon Mangubat – (ca. 1892) was a gobernadorcillo of Dasmariñas Cavite
Antonio Mangubat – (year 1898) Mactan Island Cabeza Spanish Government 
(year 1902) Mactan Island first appointed Municipal President U.S. Regime. 
(Mactan Island last Cabeza (Spanish regime) ; 1st municipal president (American regime)until year 1902.
Pascual Dela Serna y Mangubat – the last  Juez de Paz of Lapulapu Spanish government ; (year 1899) Mactan Island President Interim Revolutionary Government ;
(year 1905 &  year 1907-1910) Mactan Island mayor U.S. Government.  - Pascual was the first elected President(Mayor)  of Lapu-lapu City U.S. government. In 1905, Mactan Island held its first municipal elections, and Pascual Mangubat (de la Cerna) was elected town President.
Bartolome Dimataga y Mangubat  (1910–1916 ; 1919–1928) Mactan Island Municipal President. His direct descendants include, Mayor Mariano Dimataga (Lapu-lapu City) ; Cabinet Secretary Jose Rene Almendras, former Philippines first lady Leonila Dimataga Garcia ; former Vice Mayor (Danao, Cebu) Rosita Dimataga Almendras. 
Tomasa Mangubat – mother of Pascual dela Serna the last juez de paz of Lapu–Lapu and the first elected municipal president(mayor) of Lapu–Lapu City. The visita chapel of Mactan Island where Sr. San Roque was enshrined is said to have been entrusted to the Mangubat family who founded the first town(Opon) in Mactan Island in year 1600s, up to the time when Tomasa Mangubat, a daughter of Alejandro Mangubat married the first Rito dela Serna in the 1800s.her descendants include the late former Governor of Cebu Vicente dela Serna, former Vice Governor of Cebu Agnes Magpale, mayor Mariano Dimataga, Mayor Ernest Weigel, and Mayor Arturo Radaza. 
Dr. Liborio L. Mangubat - (1924 - 2006) from Imus Cavite one of the pioneers of Philippine ophthalmology. He served as managing editor of the Philippine Journal of Ophthalmology from 1969 to 1975. He was a diplomate of both the American and the Philippine Board of Ophthalmology.President of the Philippine Ophthalmological Society from 1967 to 1970. Dr. Mangubat is a pillar of the Philippine Society of Cosmetic Surgery, having served as its President for 8 years (1987-1994).
Dr. Dominador I. Mangubat – (1904–1980), is a former provincial Governor of Cavite (1954–1955) from Dasmariñas; also the Major of the (FACGF) Fil-American Cavite Guerilla Forces – for the Battle of the Liberation of the City of Dasmariñas, Cavite. World War II.
Isidro Mangubat – Municipal President (1924–1927) of Dasmariñas Cavite. The Mangubat Family owned a vast 200 hectares of prime, fertile agricultural land in Dasmariñas Cavite, and one of the prominent political families in Dasmariñas Cavite since Don Leon Mangubat during the Spanish period.
Doroteo Mangubat – Municipal President (1934–1937) of Dasmariñas Cavite.
Col. Estanislao Mangubat Carungcong – Municipal President  (1931–1934) of Dasmariñas, Cavite. former Colonel of the 4th Infantry Regiment (FACGF) and headed the battle for Liberation of the City of Dasmariñas, Cavite February 3, 1945
Captain Elpidio Mangubat Barzaga Sr. - former Captain of the 4th Infantry Regiment (FACGF) and headed the battle for Liberation of the City of Dasmariñas, Cavite February 3, 1945
Capt. Feliciano Mangubat - Doctor / Battalion Surgeon  - U.S Army & guerrilla forces World War 2  - Palawan
Salvador Mangubat (year 1929)Justicia Mayor or Justice of Peace- Borbon, Cebu
Pedro Mangubat – (Borbon, Cebu last Cabeza (Spanish regime) ; 1st municipal president (American regime)
Santiago Mangubat – (Borbon, Cebu 3rd municipal president under the American regime)
Montano Mangubat – (Borbon, Cebu 4th municipal president under the American regime)
Rev. Dr. Osbaldo Mangubat Padilla – the first Filipino priest to enter the Vatican Academy of Diplomacy and presently the Papal Nuncio to Korea and to Mongolia; Previous Posts: Apostolic Nuncio to Panama, Apostolic Nuncio to Sri Lanka, Apostolic Nuncio to Nigeria, Apostolic Nuncio to Costa Rica; Current Post: Apostolic Nuncio to Korea and Apostolic Nuncio to Mongolia; In Current office Since: April 26, 2008 ;  Nuncio Since: 17 Dec 1990 – Present.
Norsem Mangubat – spokesperson of the Regional Committee of the Communist Party of the Philippines, Central Mindanao
Rubio Manggubat – spokesperson New People's Army, Eastern Samar (Sergio Lobina Command).
Jaime Virata Mangubat, M.D. (1927 Manila – 2012 Wayne County, Tennessee, United States) – the street to Wayne County General Hospital was named J. V. Mangubat Drive in his honor. In 2007, the Tennessee Legislature honored him by proclaiming April 13 as Dr. J. V. Mangubat Day.
Jim Mangubat - Mayor, Wayne County, Tennessee 
Raul Rex Mangubat – City Vice-Mayor of Dasmariñas, Cavite (2016–present), Provincial Board Member of Cavite (2007–2016), Municipal Councillor (1998–2007)
Atty. Eldwin Mangubat Alibutdan – former Provincial Vice-Governor of Zamboanga Sibugay ;former Mayor.
Maria Cristina Mangubat Garcia - Vice Governor of Bataan 
Atty. Roldan Mangubat – former Board member ; Vice-mayor of Mactan Island
Juan Mendoza Margubat (year 1898) Soldado - San Martin Batangas
Justo Apaya Mangubat  - (year 1897) was a recipient of the Spanish Military Cross or Medal of Valor with red distinction. As a soldier's of the Spanish Empire he was sent to CUBA,  to fight against the Cuban War of Independence (1895-1898).
Commander Mangubat – Commander of Hukbalahap unit (year 1940s-1960s).

Notes

References 

Cebuano-language surnames
Surnames of Philippine origin
Filipino datus, rajas and sultans